Backusella mclennaniae is a species of zygote fungus in the order Mucorales. It was described by Andrew S. Urquhart and James K. Douch in 2020. The specific epithet is in honour of Australian mycologist Ethel Irene McLennan. The type locality is Morwell National Park, Australia.

See also
 
 Fungi of Australia

References

External links
 

Mucoraceae
Fungi described in 2020